Disney's Pirates of the Caribbean: Swashbuckling Sea Songs was released on CD in 2007, as part of a CD/DVD combo pack, packaged with Pirates of the Caribbean: Dead Man's Chest, and offered at Wal-Mart stores. The CD contained the following 14 tracks, by Various Artists.

Away, Away, Away (2:45)
Treasure (2:06)
The First Mate Is a Monkey (2:28)
Welcome to the Caribbean (2:57)
Stowaway  Listen Listen (2:41)  
The Legend of Davy Jones (Forty Fathoms Deep) (3:41)
Shiver My Timbers (2:18)
Yo, Ho, Ho (And a Bottle of Rum) (2:01)
Sailing for Adventure (2:33)
Blow the Man Down (2:51)
The Pirate King (2:22)
Pirates of the Black Tide (3:10)
Davy Jones' Locker (2:33)
Yo Ho (A Pirate's Life for Me) (5:43)

References

Pirates of the Caribbean music
2006 compilation albums